The Busy-Body was a pen name used by Benjamin Franklin and Joseph Breintnall in a column  printed in The American Weekly Mercury, an early American newspaper founded and published by Andrew Bradford. There are 32 letters in "The Busy-Body" series. The essays were printed in 1729.

History
In 1728 Franklin and Hugh Meredith conspired to start a newspaper that would compete with Andrew Bradford and his The American Weekly Mercury. Franklin mentioned their intentions to a journeyman seeking employment named George Webb. Samuel Keimer in turn learned from Webb about Franklin and Meredith's enterprise and labored to launch his own newspaper, Pennsylvania Gazette before Franklin and Meredith. The first issue of Keimer's Gazette appeared December 24, 1728. Franklin describes the events in his Autobiography of Benjamin Franklin (1791):

"The Busy-Body" was intended to suppress Keimer's readership by bolstering Bradford's sales of The American Weekly Mercury.  "The Busy-Body No.1" appeared February 4, 1729; "The Busy-Body No.32" ended the run abruptly on September 25, 1729, the same week that Franklin and Meredith bought the failing Pennsylvania Gazette from Keimer.

Authorship

Since the 1790s, it has been widely held that Franklin wrote the first four letters in "The Busy-Body" series, contributed to numbers five and eight, while Breintnall wrote the remaining twenty-six (Albert Smyth, II, 100n. in Tolles, 247). Marginalia on the issue of The American Weekly Mercury from February 18, 1729 held by the archives of The Library Company of Philadelphia (most likely made by Franklin) suggest that, "The Busy Body was begun by B.F. who wrote the first four Numbers, Part of No. 5, part of No. 8, the rest by J. Brintnal [sic]." Franklin's Autobiography is the primary source of our knowledge that it was Breintnall who took over "The Busy Body."

Letters

No. 1
The first article in "The Busy-Body" series was written by Benjamin Franklin and published February 4, 1729. In "The Busy-Body no. 1" Franklin establishes the character of the anonymous Busy-Body as a self-declared "Censor Morum", or a critic of morals.

"The Busy-Body No.1" was the lead-off article of Andrew Bradford's The American Weekly Mercury the week that it appeared. The letters stayed at the front of the publication for 32 weeks.

No. 18
"The Busy-Body No. 18" was written by Joseph Breintnall. Published on June 19, 1729, No. 18 is notable for its inclusion of the poem, "A plain Description of one single Street in this City." The poem, which offers a glimpse into colonial Philadelphia in 1729, is attributed to Breintnall, though the narrative persona of The Busy Body only names the author of the poem as "a Friend." The poem describes a progressive walk down Market Street in the city of Philadelphia, from the Delaware River to the Schuylkill River. "A plain Description of one Single Street in this City" opens with an account of the Market Street docks and the nearby homes of merchants. The poem then goes on to describe local landmarks of colonial Philadelphia, including the courthouse, the "Stocks, Post and Pillory,"  and the Quaker Meeting House that once stood at the intersection of Market and Second. The poem also catalogs some of the various tradesmen's shops that once populated this central street.

References

External links 
The Papers of Benjamin Franklin, online archive which includes the Franklin's contributions to "The Busy Body"

Works by Benjamin Franklin
Writing duos
Columns (periodical)
18th-century pseudonymous writers
Collective pseudonyms